Quartzite Mountain is a summit in the U.S. state of Nevada.

Quartzite Mountain was named for nearby quartzite deposits.

References

Mountains of Nye County, Nevada